12 Rounds may refer to:
 12 Rounds (band)
 12 Rounds (film)